Paradoxurus is a genus of three palm civets within the viverrid family that was denominated and first described by Frédéric Cuvier in 1822.
The Paradoxurus species have a broad head, a narrow muzzle with a large rhinarium that is deeply sulcate in the middle. Their large ears are rounded at the tip. The tail is nearly as long as the head and body.

The three species are the Asian palm civet, the Golden palm civet, and the Brown palm civet.

Characteristics 
Paradoxurus species have a broad head, a narrow muzzle with a large rhinarium that is deeply sulcate in the middle. Their large ears are rounded at the tip, the interior ridges and bursae are well developed. The skull exhibits marked muscular moulding, and the postorbital area is deeply constricted shortly behind the well-developed postorbital processes. It is considerably narrower than the interorbital area and than the muzzle above the canines. The palate is not produced behind to cover the anterior half of the mesopterygoid fossa, and is flat and expanded between the posterior cheek teeth. The tail is nearly as long as the head and body, sometimes quite as long, and about six times as long as the hind foot.

Taxonomy
As of 2005, this genus was defined as comprising three species native to Southeast Asia:

In 2009, it was proposed to also include the golden wet-zone palm civet (P. aureus,  Cuvier, 1822), the Sri Lankan brown palm civet (P. montanus, Kelaart, 1852) and the golden dry-zone palm civet (P. stenocephalus, Groves et al., 2009), which are endemic to Sri Lanka. A subsequent study found very low genetic diversity and no geographical structure within the golden palm civet and did not support the proposed split. Comparison of morphological data indicate that the Asian palm civet comprises three major clades that should be recognized as separate species: namely one in the Indian subcontinent and Southeast Asia (as Paradoxurus hermaphroditus sensu stricto), one in Sumatra, Java and other small islands (Paradoxurus musanga), and the third in the Philippines and the Mentawai Islands (Paradoxurus philippensis). Genetic data, however, do not support species level distinction.

References

External links

 
Viverrids
Taxa named by Frédéric Cuvier
Mammal genera